Black Debbath Hyller Kvinnen! (Black Debbath Praise The Woman) is the fifth album from Norwegian band Black Debbath.

Track listing

Personnel
Lars Lønning – guitar, vocals, theremin
Ole-Petter Andreassen – drums, percussion, choir
Aslag Guttormsgaard – guitar, vocals, xylophone, theremin
Egil Hegerberg – bass, vocals, keyboard
Tommy Reite – bass on "Jag Är Din Pojkvän, Yeah" and "Pussy In The Bank"
Christer Knutsen – piano on "Pussy In The Bank"
Tormod Melaas Holm – saxophone
Peder Øiseth – trumpet
Monica Lystad – choir on "Pussy In The Bank"
Vanja Friksen – choir on "Pussy In The Bank"
Marianne Pentha – choir on "Pussy In The Bank"
Hans Josef Groh – cello
Andre Orvik – violin
Dorthe Dreier – strings
Vegard Johnsen – violin
Øyvind Blomstrøm – organ
Elisabeth Cederberg – choir on "Femogtredve Og Heit"
Agnete Kjølsrud – vocals on "Kjøss Meg I Rauma"
Hedvig and donkey – compliments on "De Enda Nyere Nyfeministene"
Uffe from Abramis Brama – cowbell
Roar Nilsen – wind and string arrangements
LP Lorenz – photography
Christian Bloom – illustrations and design

External links
Album on official website
Black Debbath official website
Duplex Records website

Black Debbath albums
2007 albums